The Nursery Site, RI-273 is a prehistoric archaeological site in Westerly, Rhode Island.  Located near the Westerly Airport, this site has yielded evidence of Woodland Period stone tool work.

The site was listed on the National Register of Historic Places in 1984.

See also
National Register of Historic Places listings in Washington County, Rhode Island

References

Archaeological sites on the National Register of Historic Places in Rhode Island
Westerly, Rhode Island
National Register of Historic Places in Washington County, Rhode Island